Christos Tsiamoulis (Χρήστος Τσιαμούλης , born Athens 1961) is a Greek musicologist and musician. He is best known for his writings on Greek and East Mediterranean folk music traditions, and as a singer and musician in recordings of recovered Greek folk songs and traditions.

Discography
Christos Tsiamoulis meets Kh'Alil Karadouman* - Where Nostalgia Hurts (CD) Lyra ML 0708 2001

With Ensemble Dynámeis tou Aigaíou
 "Dynámeis tou Aigaíou"1985 (LYRA) Mílo mou kókkino 
"Íchos V' "1987 (EMI) Misó fengári próvale 
 "Anatolikó Paráthyro" 1989 (MBI) Kókkina cheíli fílisa 
 "Óles oi Méres pou Éleipa" 2002 (Filocalia Romana)

Own recordings
"Áthos o Emós" 1992 (LYRA)
"Erotókastro" 1994 (FM RECORDS)
"Ávra Thalassiní" 1995 [Me tin Kaíti Kouliá] (FM RECORDS)
"Mousikés tis Ionikís Gis" 1996 (Kéntro Mikrasiatikón Spoudón)
 "Metamórfosis" 1997 with Pedro Estevan Glossa Records
"Monácha gia na Taxidévo" 1997 with Alk. Ioannídi, K. Papadopoúlou and S. Papázoglou (LYRA)
"Tragoúdia kai Skopoí tou Póntou" 1998 with M. Kaliontzídi (Anexártiti Paragogí)
"O Chr. Tsiamoúlis synantá ton Chalíl Karantoumán" 2001 live (LYRA)
"Anéspera" 2003 with G. Amarantídi (LIBRA)
"Sas ta 'pan álloi?" 2003 Kálanta Dodekaimérou (Melodikó Karávi)
"Afýlachti Skopiá" 2004 with Lizéta Kaliméri and Manóli Lidáki (LIBRA)
"Carte - postale" 2005 instrumental (Melodikó Karávi)
"Dodekáorto" 2006 with E. Vitáli, M. Mitsiá, Alk. Ioanídi, G. Charoúli (Institoúto "'Agios Máximos o Graikós")

Participations
"Apópse stou Thomá" with K. Féri 
"Katharós Ouranós kai Ánemos eínai" with G. Stavrianó (FM RECORDS) 
"Pergaminí" with El. Perinoú (AN'KI) 
"To mantíli tis Neráidas" with F. Papadódima (LYRA) 
"O anthós tou tragoudioú" with L. Kaliméri (LYRA) 
"Smýrni" Estoudiantína N. Ionías Vólou (MINOS) 
"Dákry sto Gyalí" Estoudiantína N. Ionías Vólou (MINOS) 
"Álfa len to próto grámma" songs from the Peleponnes (Melodikó Karávi) 2004 
"Ródo tou Anémou" G. Zínkiris (Melodikó Karávi) 2003 
"To Kleidí" M. Lidákis (AKTI) 2004 
"Kókkino Akrogiáli" M. Lidákis (AKTI) 2004 
"Tampachaniótika" Lámpis Xyloúris (SEISTRON) 2005 
"Melodíes tis Anatolís" (Archeío Ellinikís Mousikís) 
"Choroí tis Ellinikís Anatolís" (Archeío Ellinikís Mousikís) 2005

References

External links
Official Website

1961 births
Living people
Musicians from Athens
Greek musicologists